Down the Elements is an EP by indie rock band Japancakes. It was released in 2000 on Kindercore.

Production
The EP was produced by Andy Baker. Its songs were taken from the same recording sessions that produced the band's debut release.

Critical reception
In his review for Westword, Michael Roberts wrote: "[Frontman Eric] Berg creates instrumental music that's alternately stirring and meditative, straightforward and intricate, undemanding and daring. But whereas Tortoise, an obvious influence, can sometimes seem a bit clinical, Japancakes retains a garagey, hey-kids-let's-put-on-a-show feel. It's esoterica of a notably warm and inviting sort." CMJ New Music Report deemed "A. W. Sonic" "an impossibly buoyant 11-minute jam."

Track listing
 "Version 1"
 "A. W. Sonic"
 "Sputnik"
 "Down the Elements"

References 

2000 albums
Japancakes albums